Mouth of Me is the second studio album by South African electronica band Lark. It is a reworking of their first EP of the same name, with remixes and two new tracks.

Track listing

References

2007 albums
Lark (band) albums